Trust No One may refer to:

Trust No One (Dave Navarro album), 2001
Trust No One (N17 album), 1997
Trust No One (Hopes Die Last album), 2012
Trust No One (DevilDriver album), 2016
Trust No One (Tsunami Bomb album), 2016
"Trust No One", a slogan from The X-Files
Trust No One, a book part of The 39 Clues which was released on December 4, 2012 and written by Linda Sue Park
Trust no one (Internet security), a design philosophy for programming software and Internet applications
"Trust No One", the phrase from Gravity Falls
"Trust no one", phrase used prominently twice in the trailer narration for the Charles Bronson film Breakheart Pass, 1975
Trust No One: The Hunt for the Crypto King, 2022